Dendrophilia henanensis is a moth of the family Gelechiidae. It was described by H.H. Li and Z.M. Zheng in 1998. It is found in China (Henan).

References

henanensis
Moths described in 1998